Edzard may refer to:

Given name
 Edzard I, Count of East Frisia (1462–1528)
 Edzard II, Count of East Frisia (1532–1599)
 Edzard Cirksena (born 1441), East Frisian chieftain at Greetsiel, Norden, Emden and Brokmerland
 Edzard Ernst (born 1948), academic physician and researcher specializing in complementary and alternative medicine
 Edzard Koning (1869–1954), Dutch painter
 Edzard Reuter (born 1928), CEO of Daimler-Benz from 1987 to 1995
 Edzard Schaper (1908–1984), German author
 Edzard Schmidt-Jortzig (born 1941), German jurist

Surname
 Christine Edzard (born 1945), film director, writer, and costume designer, nominated for BAFTA and Oscar awards for her screenwriting
 Dietz-Otto Edzard (1930–2004), German scholar of the Ancient Near East and grammarian of the Sumerian language

See also
 Edward
 Zard

Masculine given names